Hiroshima Telecasting Co., Ltd. (HTV, 広島テレビ放送株式会社, callsign: JONX-TV) is a TV station in Hiroshima.  It is affiliated with Nippon News Network and Nippon Television Network System.  It is broadcast in Hiroshima Prefecture.

History
HTV began broadcasting on September 1, 1962 as a primary affiliate of both NNN  and FNN and a secondary affiliate of Nihon Educational Television. It remained affiliated with NET until 1970, when Hiroshima Home Television signed on and took over the NET (later ANN) affiliation. On October 1, 1975, TV Shinhiroshima began operations as an FNN affiliate, leaving HTV as an affiliate of NNN. The station began broadcasting in digital in November 2005, and would cease operations on its analog signal on July 24, 2011.

External links
Official website of Hiroshima TV

1962 establishments in Japan
Mass media in Hiroshima
Companies based in Hiroshima Prefecture
Television stations in Japan
Nippon News Network
Television channels and stations established in 1962